Chyrzyno  is a settlement in the administrative district of Gmina Górzyca, within Słubice County, Lubusz Voivodeship, in western Poland, close to the German border.

The settlement has a population of 5.

References

Chyrzyno